Poul Bang (17 February 1905 – 6 July 1967) was a Danish film producer and director. He produced 24 films between 1950 and 1967. He also directed 23 films between 1943 and 1963.

Life 
He was the son of Camillo Cavour Bang (1861–1949) and Augusta Pouline Boas (1868–1919). His brother Peter Boas Bang, five years older, was founder and co-owner of Bang & Olufsen, where his father was for a time chairman of the board.

Bang was trained as an engineer and started working as a sound engineer at Fotorama in 1932. He later worked at Palladium and ASA Film before becoming production manager, instructor and director at Saga Studio. He was also a teacher at the film school.

On 21 June 1930 Bang married Ebba Charlotte Valeur (1907-65), with whom he had four children: Lise, Mette, Niels, and Anne.

At Saga Studio in 1943 he met the young photographer Annelise Reenberg; they were married on 10 May 1967.

He is buried at Bispebjerg Cemetery.

Filmography

References

External links 
 
 
 

1905 births
1967 deaths
Film directors from Copenhagen
Danish film producers